Israel Shield (Hebrew: מגן ישראל) is Israel's national program to combat the COVID-19 pandemic. Spearheaded by the Ministry of Health, it is led by a "COVID czar," a position that, since June 2021, is held by Salman Zarka. The institution of the program coincided with the absorption of the March 2020  into the July 2020  legislation (also known informally as the "Great Coronavirus Law").

The COVID czar
Subordinate to the Minister of Health and to the ministry's director, the COVID czar still directly consults with the Prime Minister. The COVID czar's recommendations generally receive wide publicity in the press. All three COVID czars had been doctors who had previously held prominent public health roles. 

In June 2021, the current COVID czar, Salman Zarka, was appointed by the Minister of Health, Nitzan Horowitz, replacing Nachman Ash, with the latter becoming the ministry's director. In November 2020, Ash, himself, had replaced the first COVID czar, Ronni Gamzu, who was originally appointed to the position in July of that year.

References

External links
https://govextra.gov.il/ministry-of-health/magen-israel/magen-israel/ (Hebrew) — summary of the program on the Ministry of Health's website